Güler Sabancı (born 1955) is a Turkish businesswoman, a third-generation female member of the Sabancı family, and the chairperson of the family-controlled Sabancı Holding, the second-largest industrial and financial conglomerate in Turkey. As of 2020, she is listed as the 76th most powerful woman in the world by Forbes, which first recognized her in 1999.

Education and early career
Güler was born the daughter and first child of İhsan Sabancı and his wife Yüksel in 1955 in Adana, Turkey. After finishing high school at TED Ankara College in Ankara, she was educated in business administration at Boğaziçi University in Istanbul. In 1978 she started her professional career at LasSA, a family-owned tire production company in Kocaeli Province. She was then appointed general manager of KordSA, a position she held for 14 years. Later, Güler Sabancı became a member of the board of directors at Sabancı Holding, heading the tires and reinforcement materials group, as well as having responsibility for human resources.

Sabancı Holding

Güler Sabancı is the chairwoman and managing director of Sabancı Holding, one of the leading and most reputable business groups in Turkey. She started her career at the tire manufacturing company of the group and held various roles at the other group companies. Ms. Sabancı is the Founding President of the Sabancı University and also acts as chairman of the Sakip Sabancı Museum and chairwoman of the board of trustees of the Sabancı Foundation, the leading private foundation in Turkey. She is the first and only female member of European Round Table of Industrialists (ERT). In October 2013, she was named 2nd on Fortune’s 50 Most Powerful Women in Business (outside USA). She has received several awards for philanthropy and leadership including the David Rockefeller Bridging Leadership Award, the Clinton Global Citizen Award, a Raymond Georis Innovative Philanthropist Award  and a European School of Management Responsible Leadership Award.

In 2012, Sabancı was appointed a member of the board of United Nations Global Compact, the UN's highest-level advisory body involving business, civil society, labour and employers organizations.

As of 2020, she is listed as the 76th most powerful woman in the world by Forbes.

Awards, decorations and honorary degrees
Fortune’s 50 Most Powerful Women in Business (outside USA) 
David Rockefeller Bridging Leadership Award
Clinton Global Citizen Award 
Raymond Georis Innovative Philanthropist Award 
European School of Management Responsible Leadership Award

Orders and decorations
 2007 –  : Order of Leopold II
 2009 –  : Order of Civil Merit
 2010 –  : Silbernes Ehrenkreuz der Republik Österreich
 2010 –  : National Order of the Legion of Honour

Awards
 2006 –  : Honorary Degree by Drexel University
 2007 –  : Corporate Partner Award by American - Turkish Society
 2009 –  : Raymond Georis Prize for Innovative Philanthropy by Council of the European Union
 2011 –  : Schumpeter Prize in memory of the famous Austrian economist Joseph A. Schumpeter
 2011 –  : ESMT Responsible Leadership Award by European School of Management and Technology
 2011 –  : Clinton Global Citizen Award by Clinton Foundation

Personal life
Sabancı is notably private about her personal life, purposefully keeping quiet about her relationships.   As of 2021, she was in a relationship with Eda Taşpınar.

Sabancı has ongoing legal battles with her family regarding her father's exclusion from the family fortune prior to his death in 1979. Despite viewing Sakıp Sabancı as her idol, alongside her siblings, she was forced into fighting to obtain her rightful position and status within the family.

References

External links
Creating Emerging Markets Interview  at the Harvard Business School

1955 births
Living people
Businesspeople from Istanbul
TED Ankara College Foundation Schools alumni
Guler Sabanci
Boğaziçi University alumni
Turkish women in business
Turkish chief executives
Order of Civil Merit members
People from Adana